Mikhail Iosifovich Gurevich ( – 12 November 1976) was a Soviet aircraft designer who co-founded the Mikoyan-Gurevich military aviation bureau along with Artem Mikoyan. The bureau is famous for its fighter aircraft, rapid interceptors and multi-role combat aircraft which were staples of the Soviet Air Forces throughout the Cold War. The bureau designed 170 projects of which 94 were made in series. In total, 45,000 MiG aircraft have been manufactured domestically, of which 11,000 aircraft were exported. The last plane which Gurevich personally worked on before his retirement was the MiG-25.

Life and career

Born to a Jewish family his father was a winery mechanic in the small township of Rubanshchina (Kursk region in Russia). In 1910 he graduated from gymnasium in Okhtyrka (Kharkiv region) with the silver medal and entered the Mathematics department at Kharkiv University. After a year, for participation in revolutionary activities, he was expelled from the university and from the region and continued his education in Montpellier University. He was at SUPAERO in Toulouse in the 1913 class with Marcel Bloch, who later took the name Marcel Dassault.

In the summer 1914 Gurevich was visiting his home when World War I broke out. This and later the Russian Civil War interrupted his education. In 1925 he graduated from the Aviation faculty of Kharkiv Technological Institute and worked as an engineer of the state company "Heat and Power".

In 1929 Gurevich moved to Moscow to pursue the career of aviation designer. Soviet design was a state-run affair, organised in so-called OKBs or design bureaus. In 1937 Gurevich headed a designer team in the Polikarpov Design Bureau, where he met his future team partner, Artem Mikoyan. In late 1939 they created the Mikoyan-Gurevich Design Bureau, with Gurevich in the position of Vice Chief Designer, and after 1957 as its Chief Designer, a post he kept until his retirement in 1964. This is remarkable, considering that he never joined the Communist Party.
 
In 1940 Mikoyan and Gurevich designed and built the high-altitude MiG-1 fighter plane, starting from a project partially developed by Polikarpov's team. The improved MiG-3 fighter aircraft was widely used during World War II. In the years after the war, the two designed the first Soviet jet fighters, including the first supersonic models. The last model Gurevich worked on was the MiG-25 interceptor, which is among the fastest military aircraft ever to enter service.

Honours and awards
 Hero of Socialist Labor (1957)
 Five State Stalin Prizes (1941, 1947, 1948, 1949, 1953)
 Order of Lenin (1962)

References

1892 births
1976 deaths
People from Sudzhansky District
People from Sudzhansky Uyezd
Russian Jews
Russian aerospace engineers
Supaéro alumni
Russian inventors
Soviet aerospace engineers
Jewish Russian scientists
20th-century Russian engineers
Russian Aircraft Corporation MiG
Kharkiv Polytechnic Institute alumni
National University of Kharkiv alumni
University of Montpellier alumni
Heroes of Socialist Labour
Stalin Prize winners
Lenin Prize winners
Recipients of the Order of Lenin
Recipients of the Order of the Red Banner of Labour
Recipients of the Order of the Red Star
Burials at Serafimovskoe Cemetery